The 2008–09 Volvo Ocean Race was a yacht race held between 4 October 2008 and 27 June 2009—the 10th edition of the round the world Volvo Ocean Race.

The eight participating boats made ten stops in nine countries around the world. The first offshore leg of the 2008–09 Race started in Alicante, Spain, on 11 October 2008, with the in-port race having been held seven days earlier. A total of ten legs created the route, with seven in-port (IP) races held at various cities around the world. Unlike previous editions, the route crossed the Strait of Malacca at the Malay Archipelago, instead of Cape Leeuwin south of Australia. The boats covered  in the course of their journey. The chief executive of the 2008–09 race was Knut Frostad.

On 15 June 2009, Ericsson 4, skippered by Torben Grael, finished third on leg 9 from Marstrand to Stockholm, Sweden. With their third-place finish, they were able to secure overall victory.
Ericsson 4 completed the race with 114 ½ points, whilst Puma ended with 105 ½. Afterwards Kochi was described as a "memorable" port but Galway was the best.

Participants

Budgets
Ericsson's budgets were €50 million, whilst Puma's budget was approximately €20 million. By comparison, the joint Irish and Chinese team, Green Dragon, received €8 million from the Irish government and €4 million from China.

Team websites

Ericsson Racing Team
Equipo Telefonica
Green Dragon Racing Team
Puma Ocean Racing
Team Delta Lloyd
Team Russia

Route

Summary

The route also included seven ‘scoring gates’ (at Fernando de Noronha, Mauritius, Pulau Weh, Indonesia, Latitude 36S, Cape Horn, Fernando de Noronha and St John's, Newfoundland). Yachts scored 'half-points' at these gates, the same as for the in port races.

Stopovers

Cape Town 
Ericsson 4 won leg one of the 2008–09 Volvo Ocean Race from Alicante, Spain, to Cape Town in South Africa in a time of 21 days, 17 hours and 54 minutes.

Kochi 
The second leg of began on 15 November 2008, with the sailors avoiding pirates off the coast of Somalia on their way to India.

Singapore 
Telefonica Blue won leg three of the 2008–09 Volvo Ocean Race from Kochi, India, to Singapore in Singapore. Puma Ocean Racing finished in second place, whilst Ericsson 3 and Ericsson 4 finished in third and fourth places respectively. The race was described as very close, with the top four boats finishing the race within twenty minutes of each other. The race took ten days to complete, ending on 22 December 2008.

Qingdao 
Telefonica Blue won leg four of the 2008–09 Volvo Ocean Race from Singapore in Singapore to Qingdao, China. Puma Ocean Racing finished in second place, whilst Ericsson 4 finished in third place. Telefonica Black, Ericsson 3 and Delta Lloyd all withdrew to sail to the Philippines and Taiwan for repairs. The leg lasted from 18 January until 29 January 2009.

Rio de Janeiro 

The teams left for Boston in the United States on leg five, which began on 11 April 2009.

Boston 
The boats arrived in Boston in late April, with an in port race on 9 May.
Leg 6 was won by Ericsson 4 at 21:05 GMT, 26 April 2009 after 15 days, 10 hours and 31 minutes of sailing

Galway 
Ericsson 4 won leg seven of the 2008–09 Volvo Ocean Race from Boston in the United States to Galway, crossing the Atlantic Ocean in a time of seven days, 10 hours, 33 minutes and 51 seconds. Puma Ocean Racing finished in second place, one hour behind. Green Dragon finished in third position, whilst Telefonica Blue finished in fourth place.

Fáilte Ireland West sponsored the two-week Galway Stopover. It was expected that 140,000 people would visit Galway during the Stopover but the final total significantly outnumbered half a million, with some early reports suggesting that over 600,000 people had come to Galway to view the boats. €43 million was the economic total predicted for Galway from the events but the final total was anticipated to be over €80 million. Figures released the following November suggested the total was just under €56 million. The atmosphere and support in Galway was described positively.

At least 50,000 people watched the seven yachts leave Galway on Leg 8 of the race. Irish President Mary McAleese made a public speech before the sailors took off, noting their “extraordinary skill and resilience” which had “inspired all of us”. Liu Biwei, China's ambassador to Ireland, spoke of how he favoured the Irish-Chinese pairing, and the fleet received several blessings. The sailors reported of the enjoyment they had in Galway, with Puma skipper Ken Read describing it as "the best stopover I have ever been involved with" saying he would return the following year after enjoying his time on the golf course and declaring that there was "something about Ireland and myself that seem to like each other".

Galway is expected to compete again for a stopover during the next race, with other Irish destinations such as Belfast and Dún Laoghaire expected to compete also.

Marstrand 

Ericsson 4 won leg eight of the 2008–09 Volvo Ocean Race from Galway to Marstrand in Sweden in a time of 12 hours and 57 minutes, their third consecutive victory and fifth overall Puma finished in second place and Green Dragon finished in third place. It was Green Dragon's second successive podium finish and, although they finished third, they had led for most of the race.

The boats left Galway Bay, journeying southward along the west coast of Ireland. They then travelled in a south-easterly direction across the Irish Sea to south England, moving in an eastwards direction up the English Channel. The teams then travelled up into the North Sea until arrival at the Baltic Sea.

Stockholm 
Puma won leg nine of the 2008–09 Volvo Ocean Race from Marstrand to Stockholm in Sweden, their first win in the race. The third place for Ericsson 4 was enough for the team to also win the overall race at this point, leading to comparisons with the victor of the previous race, Mike Sanderson and ABN AMRO One, who won at the end of leg seven in Portsmouth, England, in 2006.

Saint Petersburg 
Puma Ocean Racing had led the race for most of the way. Ericsson 4, finished in third place.

Stealth play

This race featured "Stealth play", a tactic that allowed a crew to hide its position from its competitors for a period of 12 hours. It was designed to add a tactical dimension to the race, whereby a team might opt to make a break from the fleet without the rest of the competitors knowing what they are doing and where they are on the race track. The ploy can first be used on leg one, leg two, leg five, leg six and leg seven. If it is not used on one leg, it cannot be accumulated for use on a following leg.

Leg Results

In-Port Race Results

Overall Results 

Notes
 –  Telefónica Blue were penalised 3 points from their overall score for a rudder change after Leg 4.
 –  Telefónica Black were penalised 3 points from their overall score for a rudder change after Leg 1.

Records

Pictures

References

External links

Volvo Ocean Race  – Official site
Volvo Ocean Race TV – Official Web TV  site
Volvo Ocean Race Press Information – Press releases etc.
The Volvo Open 70 Rule  – Volvo Open 70 Rule
Volvo Ocean Race Official Image Gallery  – (For Media Use, but browsing is unrestricted)
Volvo Ocean Race Events Information
Volvo Ocean Race – Live reporting and TV footage

The Ocean Race
Volvo Ocean Race
Volvo Ocean Race
History of Galway (city)
Sport in Galway (city)